Christian Kracht (born 29 December 1966) is a Swiss author. His books have been translated into more than 30 languages.

Personal life
Kracht was born in Saanen in the Canton of Bern, Switzerland. He attended Schule Schloss Salem in Baden-Württemberg, Germany, and Lakefield College School in Ontario, Canada. He graduated from Sarah Lawrence College, New York, in 1989. He has lived for long spells in Buenos Aires, Lamu, Florence, Bangkok, Kathmandu, Landour, Los Angeles and Munich. He is married to German film director Frauke Finsterwalder. They live in Zurich. Kracht´s father, Christian Kracht Sr., was chief representative for the Axel Springer publishing company in the 1960s.

Journalism and collaborative work
Before becoming a novelist, Kracht worked as a journalist for a number of magazines and newspapers in Germany, including Der Spiegel. In the mid-1990s he lived and worked in New Delhi as Spiegel's Indian correspondent. Kracht then moved to Bangkok, from where he visited various other countries in South East Asia. During this period he authored travel vignettes that were serialised in the Welt am Sonntag newspaper and later collated in the book Der Gelbe Bleistift (The Yellow Pencil) in 2000. In November 2006 Kracht was a regular columnist for the newspaper Frankfurter Allgemeine Zeitung. His fortnightly column, which originally had the title Letter from..., later changed to Letter from the Past. During this time, together with American businessman David Woodard, Kracht reported on Aleister Crowley's erstwhile residence in Cefalù.

Kracht has regularly collaborated with other authors and artists. In 1998 he worked with Eckhart Nickel to co-author Ferien für immer (A permanent vacation), collated musings on "the most pleasant places on earth". In 1999 Kracht took part in the performance piece Tristesse Royale with Stuckrad-Barre, Joachim Bessing, Eckhart Nickel and Alexander, Count of Schönburg-Glauchau. The book is an edited transcript of a recording made by the contributors in which they discuss globalised popular culture while staying at Berlin's Hotel Adlon. For some commentators this publication constituted the high-water mark of so-called Popliteratur – a literary marketing phenomenon for which Kracht was the supposed figurehead. The author has repeatedly distanced himself from this epithet and has, for example, refused permission for his work to be republished in an anthology of that genre. This notwithstanding, Kracht was the editor of the anthology Mesopotamia – a collection of short stories, fragments and photo montages by authors associated with the pop literature, including Rainald Goetz, Andreas Neumeister and Benjamin von Stuckrad-Barre. First published with the subtitle "Ernste Geschichten am Ende des Jahrtausends" ("Serious stories at the turn of the Millennium"), this subtitle was dropped in its 2001 republication by Deutsche Taschenbuch Verlag in favour of an "Avant-Pop-Reader". The relabeling notably coincided with the deflating currency of the term "pop literature" in the early years of the new century.

Between September 2004 and June 2006 Kracht published the independent literary magazine Der Freund in collaboration with Eckhart Nickel. He initially lived in Kathmandu while working as the magazine's editor before leaving Nepal during a period of political unrest. The chiefly German-language magazine was ultimately completed in San Francisco with a total of eight editions as originally planned. The magazine featured regular contributions from Ira Cohen, Reinhold Messner, Ian Buruma, Stanislav Lem, Karlheinz Stockhausen, Alain Robbe-Grillet, Rem Koolhaas, Momus, David Woodard and Eduardo Kac.

February 2007 saw the publication of Metan (Methane), the product of a climbing expedition on Kilimanjaro with Ingo Niermann. The book posits that the effects of methane gas on the earth's atmosphere are part of a vast cosmic conspiracy. Early reviews varied from the critical to the bewildered, one describing it as "großer Quatsch" ("a load of nonsense"). Another reviewer refers to the book as a parody of "alarmism" and suggested it should be taken as a joke: "But if this book is taken as a joke, it probably is not a bad one".

In 2012 Kracht published an exchange of letters with Woodard entitled Five Years. Although this text is essentially a performance piece, certain episodes in their correspondence were deemed controversial, especially references to Nueva Germania. Indeed, in February 2012, Georg Diez, writing an opinion piece published in Der Spiegel alleged that Five Years exposed racist, right-wing sympathies supposedly present in Kracht's latest novel Imperium. This view was widely contested and by established critics and authors alike during a sustained literary debate in German-language newspapers and magazines.

Novels
The protagonists of Kracht's fiction embark on journeys that take them in search of an elusive moment of immersive, utopian experience or spiritual enlightenment often located in a different nation or culture. Their journey usually, but not always, results in disappointment, failure or even death. The theme of travel was introduced in Kracht's debut novel Faserland (1995), a text that is often central in the discussion of German pop literature by literary critics and scholars. While the first wave of the novel's criticism identified Faserland as a novel about the affirmation of brand names and consumer culture, a second wave of criticism suggested rather that the novels evinces the protagonist's dissatisfaction with his lifestyle and existential "ennui". Early criticism of the novel suggested the influence of Bret Easton Ellis on his work, with some commentators even accusing him of plagiarism. Since the critical re-evaluation of Faserland, however, critics have observed the potential influence on his work by younger German-language writers such as Leif Randt with his 2011 novel Schimmernder Dunst über Coby County (The glistening haze over Coby County).

The setting of Kracht's second novel 1979 is Iran and begins in medias res against the backdrop of the revolution of the Ayatollah Khomeini during the titular year. This novel also deals with alienation and a chiefly Western form of consumer existence, but it depicts the fragility of an apparently decadent Western-metropolitan value system and its powerlessness before the Eastern-totalitarian models of Islamism and Maoism. After the supposed frivolousness of Faserland, then, Kracht was now seen as on the way "towards genuine seriousness" in his writing – a view held by critics that was no doubt informed by the context of the September 11 attacks with which the novel's publication coincided. Kracht is sceptical about such a reading of his work and argues that he writes literary "light entertainment" and "comedies". Thus, during a television appearance on the popular Harald Schmidt Show in 2001, Kracht argued that his book was essentially kitsch.

The 2008 novel Ich werde hier sein im Sonnenschein und im Schatten (I will be here in sunshine and in shadow) imagines an alternative history of the twentieth century in which Lenin never returned to Russia from Switzerland, but instead founded a Swiss Soviet Republic – a Communist state engaged in the colonisation of Africa and in perpetual war with other totalitarian empires, notably with a federation of British and German fascists. Channeling Philip K. Dick's The Man in the High Castle and Ford Coppola's Apocalypse Now, the plot of the novel traces a black Swiss political commissar's journey to the heart of the empire to arrest the rogue officer Brazhinsky in the Réduit.

Ich werde hier sein im Sonnenschein und im Schatten quickly garnered acclaim in the German-speaking literary world. Broadsheet Die Welt called it a "glorious horror story". The Süddeutsche Zeitung praised the writing as not only deeply reminiscent of Ernst Jünger, but also as the "most beautiful German prose currently on offer". But the Frankfurter Rundschau reviewer discounted Ich werde hier sein as "simply moronic" and Die Tageszeitung found the text to be too diffuse and incoherent, amounting to just a "drug-clouded scenery"

The novel Imperium and its reception
Kracht's 2012 novel Imperium follows on from Ich werde hier sein im Sonnenschein und im Schatten both in its very favourable reception by critics and in the way that it presents a reimagining of history that incorporates actual persons and historical reality while playing fast and loose with dates and details. In this sense the novel bears some similarity to Die Vermessung der Welt (Measuring the World) by Daniel Kehlmann, an author with whom Kracht corresponded while composing the distinctive narrative style of Imperium. The novel follows the travails of the historical figure August Engelhardt in the Bismarck Archipelago (now Papua New Guinea) at the beginning of the twentieth century. Engelhardt is an idealistic German emigrant who establishes a plantation on an island and founds a colony of cocoivores – radical vegetarians nourished exclusively on coconuts. Engelhardt's history is interspersed with cameo appearances by other figures from German cultural history, such as Hermann Hesse, Thomas Mann and Franz Kafka. The first of Kracht's novels not to be narrated in the first-person, the omniscient narrator informs us of the protagonist's thoughts and contextualises Engelhardt's life within the broader scope of twentieth-century history.

Imperium created a stir in Germany even before its publication. Writing in Der Spiegel, critic Georg Diez suggested that the novel "above all shows the author's proximity to extreme right-wing ideas". The accusation of racism levelled at Kracht was widely repudiated by other figures in the literary industry, including publisher Helge Malchow and fellow authors, such as Daniel Kehlmann, Feridun Zaimoğlu, Necla Kelek and nobel prize winner Elfriede Jelinek.<ref>See  'Offener Brief an die Spiegel-Chefredaktion zu Kracht] , 17. February 2012.</ref>

Reviews of Imperium in the German-language press praised the novel's language, and it has been favourably compared to Joseph Conrad's Heart of Darkness in terms of both theme and style.

In 2012, Kracht was awarded the literature prize for the Swiss canton of Bern and also the Wilhelm Raabe literature prize. In the words of the awarding jury, Imperium "balances on the border between humour and horror ... with great confidence and so forms a significant twist in the tapestry of contemporary German-language literature".Imperium has been translated into over 25 different languages, including English.

Style and appearance
Kracht's novels are pastiche; a playful blend of influences appropriated from areas of "high" and "low" culture. Thus, Kracht's writings contain alienating references to other works, including Thomas Mann's Magic Mountain, the subtly ironic travel journals of Robert Byron, and Hergé's The Adventures of Tintin series. Furthermore, the ligne claire drawing style is used for the illustrations (by Dominik Monheim) in the first edition of Ferien für immer (1998), as well as for Der gelbe Bleistift (by Hugo Pratt) and the original cover of Imperium. Many of Hugo Pratt´s characters, in turn, make their appearance in Imperium.

Kracht has attested that a writer also "always performs being a writer". His performance is persuasive and has successfully seduced reviewers into sometimes overlooking the distinction between the author and narrator to erroneously identify Kracht as the autobiographical protagonist of his debut novel Faserland. He has sometimes been a controversial figure in modern German-language literature. The meaning of his pronouncements in interviews is not always obvious; his description of the Taliban leader Mullah Omar (and by implication the Taliban itself) as "camp" should perhaps be taken with a pinch of salt: in this case moral values take second place after media aesthetics. A similar principle applies to Kracht's foreword to the 2006 illustrated book Die totale Erinnerung (published with Feral House as The Ministry of Truth in the U.S.), in which Kim Jong-Il's North Korea is referred to as a gigantic simulation, whereas his apparent ignorance of actual suffering in North Korea upset some commentators.

Stage adaptations and screenplay
Since 2004 a stage version of the novel 1979, directed by Matthias Hartmann, has been performed in theatres in Zurich, Bochum and Hannover.  In 2009 the play was shown at the Burgtheater in Vienna, while a stage version of Ich werde hier sein im Sonnenschein und im Schatten has been performed at theatres in Basel, Stuttgart and Berlin. In 2015, a dramatized version of Imperium premiered at Thalia Theater in Hamburg, Germany. A stage version of The Dead (Kracht novel) premiered in December 2017 at Bern Theatre in Switzerland`s capital.

Kracht co-authored the screenplay for the 2013 film Finsterworld, which was directed by his wife Frauke Finsterwalder. The couple also co-wrote the screenplay for Finsterwalder's second feature film, Sisi & I, a biopic about Empress Elisabeth of Austria, will premiere at the 73rd Berlin Film Festival on 19 February 2023.

Kracht's 2021 novel Eurotrash was adapted for the stage by Jan Bosse at Schaubühne, Berlin, premiering on 18 November 2021.

Publications

BooksFaserland (novel), 1995Ferien für immer (travel writing – with Eckhart Nickel), 1998Mesopotamia. Ein Avant-Pop-Reader (as publisher, anthology), 1999Tristesse Royale (with Joachim Bessing, Eckhart Nickel, Alexander von Schönburg and Benjamin von Stuckrad-Barre), 1999Der gelbe Bleistift (travel writing), 20001979 (novel), 2001Die totale Erinnerung. Kim Jong Ils Nordkorea, 2006.  Released in English with Feral House as The Ministry of Truth. New Wave. Ein Kompendium 1999–2006, 2006Metan (with Ingo Niermann), 2007Ich werde hier sein im Sonnenschein und im Schatten (novel), 2008Gebrauchsanweisung für Kathmandu und Nepal (travel writing/guide book to Nepal – with Eckhart Nickel), 2009Five Years: Briefwechsel 2004–2009. Band 1: 2004–2007 – with David Woodard, 2011, Imperium (novel), 2012, Finsterworld (screenplay), 2013The Dead (Die Toten) (novel), 2016Eurotrash (novel), 2021, 

 Audio books Liverecordings (with Benjamin von Stuckrad-Barre, Harald Schmidt and Christian Ulmen), 1999Faserland, 20001979, 2002Das Sobhraj Quartett – Asiatische Reisenotizen (with Eckhart Nickel), 2004Das Jagdgewehr ("The Hunting Gun") by Yasushi Inoue (with Sandra Schwittau, Mavie Hörbiger and Hannelore Elsner), 2005Frühstück bei Tiffany (Breakfast at Tiffany's) by Truman Capote, 2007Triptychon (with Dieter Meier, Schorsch Kamerun and Dirk von Lowtzow), 2011Imperium (with Dominik Graf), 2012Die Toten'', 2016

Distinctions 
1993 – Axel Springer Prize for Young Journalists
2009 – Phantastik-Preis der Stadt Wetzlar
2012 – Literaturpreis des Kantons Bern
2012 – Wilhelm Raabe Literature Prize
2014 – The Extraordinary Book Award
2016 – Swiss Book Prize
2016 – Hermann-Hesse-Preis
2017 – nominated for the International Dublin Literary Award
2019 – nominated for the Prix Médicis
2021 – shortlisted for the German Book Prize
2021 – Swiss Literature Awards

References 
Most references are in German.

External links 

 

1966 births
Sarah Lawrence College alumni
Living people
Swiss male novelists
Postmodern writers
20th-century Swiss novelists
21st-century Swiss novelists
20th-century male writers
21st-century male writers
People from the canton of Bern
Alumni of Schule Schloss Salem
Der Spiegel people
Swiss Book Prize winners